The County of Châteaudun was held in the 9th century by counts who also held the County of Blois. Theobald I created the first viscount of Châteaudun with the appointment of Geoffrey I, founder of the House of Châteaudun. The viscounts were entrusted with the government of the county of Châteaudun, records of whom are continuous from the mid-10th century.  The actual rule of Châteaudun between the late 9th and the mid-10th centuries, and the relationships between the count and viscounts, is uncertain. The county was revived in 1439 when the region was recreated as the County of Dunois and granted to Jean Levieux Valois des Orléans (Jean de Dunois), the illegitimate son of Louis I, Duke of Orléans, son of Charles V of France.

Châteaudun is closely associated with the County of Perche and the early rulers generally held both titles of viscount of Châteaudun and count of Perche.  There are also close ties between these counts and the counts of Anjou, and members of the House of Ingelger and House of Plantagenet descended from this line.  The family tree of the House of Châteaudun is most illustrative of these relationships.  The following lineage shows the counts of Châteaudun, the viscounts of Châteaudun, and the related counts of Perche and Anjou.  Dates shown are the approximate dates of rule.

Counts of Châteaudun

The following are the known counts of Châteaudun:
 William (through 834), also count of Blois, reportedly killed by Hastein, Viking chieftain and compatriot of Björn Ironside, son of Ragnar Lothbrok.
 Odo I (834–871), brother of Robert the Strong (count of Anjou), also count of Troyes, Anjou and Blois.
 Odo II (871–886), son of the previous, also count of Troyes
 Robert I (through 886), son of the previous, also count of Troyes
 Adalelm (886–894), nephew of the previous, also count of Troyes.
The period between Adalelm and Theobald is uncertain, but may have been filled by Counts Warnelad and Gello.
 Theobald the Trickster (through  975), also count of Blois and Chartres
 Odo I (975–996), son of the previous, also count of Blois and Chartres
 Theobald II (996–1004), son of the previous and stepson of Robert the Pious, also count of Blois and Chartres
 Odo II (1004–1037), brother of the previous, also count of Troyes, Blois, Chartres, Beauvais and Tours.
Viscounts of Châteaudun

The position of viscount of Châteaudun was created by Theobald I in 967. As noted above many of the early viscounts of Châteaudun were also counts of Perche.
 Geoffrey I (967–985), viscount of Châteaudun
 Hugh I (985–989), viscount of Châteaudun, son of the previous
 Hildegarde (989–1022), viscountess of Châteaudun, wife of the previous
 Huguh II (1022–1026), viscount of Châteaudun and archbishop of Tours, son of the previous
 Melisende (1026–1030), viscountess of Châteaudun, sister of the previous
 Geoffrey II (1030–1039), viscount of Châteaudun and count of Perche, son of the previous
 Hugh III (1039–1044), viscount of Châteaudun and count of Perche, son of the previous
 Rotrou I (1044–1080), viscount of Châteaudun and count of Perche, brother of the previous
 Hugues IV (1080–1110), viscount of Châteaudun, son of the previous
 Geoffrey III (1110–1145), viscount of Châteaudun, son of the previous
 Hugh V (1145–1176), viscount of Châteaudun, son of the previous
 Geoffrey IV (1176), viscount of Châteaudun, son of the previous
 Hugh VI (1176–1191), viscount of Châteaudun, brother of the previous
 Geoffrey V (1191–1218), viscount of Châteaudun, son of the previous
 Geoffrey VI (1218–1250), viscount of Châteaudun, son of the previous
 Clemence (1250–1259), viscountess of Châteaudun, daughter of the previous.

The line of viscounts of Châteaudun ended with the rule of Clemence.

Counts of Perche that were descendants of Geoffrey I of Châteaudun

The lines of viscounts of Châteaudun and counts of Perche diverged in 1080 with Geoffrey II.  The counts of Perche that were from the House of Châteaudun were:
 Geoffrey II (1080–1100), count of Perche and Mortagne, son of Rotrou I of Châteaudun
 Rotrou III (1100–1144), count of Perche and Mortagne, son of the previous
 Rotrou IV (1144–1191), count of Perche, son of the previous
 Geoffrey III (1191–1202), count of Perche, son of the previous
 Thomas (1202–1217), count of Perche, son of the previous
 William II (1217–1226), count of Perche, also bishop of Châlons, brother of Geoffrey III
Counts of Anjou that were descendants of Geoffrey I of Châteaudun

As noted above, the viscounts of Châteaudun were closely related to the counts of Anjou.  The direct descendants of the founder of the House of Châteaudun include:
 Hugh, son of Melisende, Viscountess of Châteaudun, and Fulcois, Count of Montagne
 Geoffrey II of Gâtinais, son of the previous
 Geoffrey III of Anjou, son of the previous
 Fulk IV of Anjou, brother of the previous
 Fulk V of Anjou, son of the previous.

The line of viscounts of Châteaudun became extinct in 1249, with the death Geoffrey VI of Châteaudun.  The lineage of the counts of Perche, extinct by 1217, ending with Thomas. The lineage of the counts of Anjou, who acquired the land by the marriage of a grandson of Fulcois, Geoffrey II of Gâtinais, with Ermengarde of Anjou, heiress of the House of Ingelger, continued on to modern times.  Their great-grandson in agnatic line was Geoffrey V of Anjou. The House of Plantagenet descended from this line.

Sources 

 Nelson, Janet L., The Annals of St-Bertin, Manchester University Press, 1991
 Phalle, Édouard de Saint, Comtes de Troyes et de Poitiers au IXe siècle: histoire d’un double échec. In Christian Settipani and Katharine S. B. Keats-Rohan, Onomastique et Parenté dans l'Occident médiéval. 2000.
 Kerrebrouck, Patrick van., Nouvelle histoire généalogique de l'auguste maison de France, vol. 1: La Préhistoire des Capétiens. 1993.
 Tout, Thomas Frederick, The Empire and the Papacy: 918-1273, Periods of European History, London: Rivingtons, 1906
 Bachrach, Bernard S, Fulk Nerra, The Neo-Roman Consul, 987-1040: A Political Biography of the Angevin Count, University of California Press, 1993
 Bury, J. B. (Editor), The Cambridge Medieval History, Volume III, Germany and the Western Empire, Cambridge University Press, 1922
 Bury, J. B. (Editor), The Cambridge Medieval History, Volume V, Contest of Empire and Papacy, Cambridge University Press, 1926
 Reuter, Timothy (Editor), The New Cambridge Medieval History, Volume III, 900-1024, Cambridge University Press, 1999
 Runciman, Steven, A History of the Crusades, Volume Two, The Kingdom of Jerusalem and the Frankish East, 1100-1187, Cambridge University Press, 1952
 Oman, Charles, Periods of European History, Volume I: The Dark Ages, 476-918, Rivingtons, London, 1928
 Tout, T. F., Periods of European History, Volume II: The Empire and the Papacy, 918-1273, Rivingtons, London, 1932
 Medieval Lands Project, Comtes du Châteaudun
 Medieval Lands Project, Comtes de Perche

Counties of France

fr:Liste des comtes et vicomtes de Châteaudun